Village Green is an urban park in Bar Harbor, Maine, United States. (Main Street is also Route 3 up until it reaches the park from the south. It then turns onto Mount Desert Street.) The park has a free public Wi-Fi network.

The town's fire and police departments are located on Firefly Lane, across from the Green.

Although the park is not fenced, its six paved entrances are at Main Street and Mount Desert Street, Mount Desert Street and Kennebec Street, Kennebec Street, two on Firefly Lane, and one at Main Street and Firefly Lane. The bisecting paths encourage pedestrians to pass through the park, instead of walk around it.

A granite bench, in memory of John Whittington Roberts (1870–1904), is in the middle of the Main Street side, beside the original 1896 cast-iron street clock (moved to this location in 1905), while a dog fountain is beside the Main and Mount Desert entrance. A memorial also stands on its Mount Desert side, just beyond the fountain.

A bandstand stands near the northern (Firefly Lane) side of the park.

A 17th-century tiered Italian fountain with 21 spigots, donated by John Callendar Livingston in 1909, is in the southwestern corner of the park. It was restored in 1992 by sculptor Clark Fitz-Gerald after having not been functional for thirty years.

Bar Harbor's Island Explorer buses leave and drop off passengers on the park's western edge, at Kennebec Street.

History
The short-lived Grand Central Hotel occupied the corner of Main and Mount Desert Streets from 1873 to 1899, when it was demolished and the space given to the town's Village Improvement Association.

The bandstand was originally the park's only amenity, albeit in a different location in the park than it is today. After a visit from sitting United States president William Howard Taft in 1910, however, a desire for additional development was kickstarted.

In the 1920s, Beatrix Farrand designed the pathways and had the bandstand rebuilt, as well as the arranging the landscaping present today.

A six-year renovation of the park began in 1999. In 2010, the park underwent further improvements — to the footpaths, lighting, planting, and the fountain area.

In 2012, the American Planning Association named the park as one of their top ten Great Places in America for Public Spaces.

Gallery

References

External links
Public Parks - Town of Bar Harbor, Maine

Buildings and structures in Bar Harbor, Maine
Parks in Bar Harbor, Maine
Urban public parks